Melissa Ann Moore (born December 27, 1963) is an American B-movie actress.

Filmography

References

External links

Living people
1963 births
American television actresses
American film actresses
American female equestrians